The spotted bat (Euderma maculatum) is a species of vesper bat and the only species of the genus Euderma.

Description
The spotted bat was first described by zoologist Joel Asaph Allen from the American Museum of Natural History in 1891. It can reach a length of 12 cm and a wingspan of 35 cm. The weight is about 15 g. It has three distinctive white spots on its black back. With ears that can grow up to 4 cm, it is said to have the largest ears of any bat species in North America.  The spotted bat's mating season is in autumn and the females produce their offspring (usually one juvenile) in June or July. Its main diet is grasshoppers and moths.

Habitat
The habitats of the spotted bat are undisturbed roosts on cliffs along the Grand Canyon in Arizona, and open and dense deciduous and coniferous forests, hay fields, deserts, marshes, riparian areas, and dry shrub-steppe grasslands in Arizona, California, Colorado, Oregon, New Mexico, Utah, Washington, and British Columbia, Canada.

Threats
Use of pesticides such as DDT and other insecticides in the 1960s led to a severe decline in the spotted bat population, but current observations had shown that it is more common than formerly believed. Abundance, population trend, and threats are widely unknown.

See also
Bats of Canada
Bats of the United States

References

Further reading
David J. Schmidly, William B. Davis: The mammals of Texas University of Texas Press, 2004 
B. J. Verts, Leslie N. Carraway: Land mammals of Oregon. University of California Press, 1998

External links
Spotted Bat

Vesper bats
Bats of the United States
Bats of Canada
Fauna of the Western United States
Fauna of the Colorado Desert
Fauna of the Mojave Desert
Fauna of the Great Basin
Fauna of the Sonoran Desert
Fauna of the California chaparral and woodlands
Taxa named by Harrison Allen
Mammals described in 1891